The 2015 Egypt Cup (also known as Pepsi Egypt Cup for sponsorship reasons) was the 83rd season of the Egypt Cup since its establishment in 1921. The winners assures a place in the 2016 CAF Confederation Cup; however as the two finalist qualified to the Champions League the berth was given to the fourth placed team in 2014–15 Egyptian Premier League.

Zamalek, the defending champions, successfully defended the title after defeating their rivals Al Ahly 2–0 in the Final to win their third consecutive title.

Schedule and format

Bracket
Numbers in parentheses represent the results of a penalty shoot-out. Teams that are bolded advanced on. If "(p)" is next to a team name, it means that they advanced on penalties.

Round of 32

Round of 16

Quarterfinals

Semifinals

Final

Top goalscorers

As of 21 September 2015.

2
Egypt Cup
2014–15 in Egyptian football